Karan Oberoi (born 26 September 1987) also known by his initials KO, is an Indian fashion model, actor and fitness model. He began his career as a graphic designer for an advertising firm, and accidentally veered into modelling while on the job. Karan has been a chosen model for some of the advertising campaigns in India for brands like Reebok, Royal Enfield and Isuzu and has walked for bigwigs in the fashion industry such as Rohit Bal, Shantanu & Nikhil and Rajesh Pratap Singh. He is also seen on the cover of magazines such as Men's Health and Health & Nutrition.

Early life and education
Karan Oberoi was born and brought up in a Sikh family in New Delhi. His mother, Jasvinder Oberoi, is an associate professor of Hindi literature in one of the colleges in Delhi University and his father, G.S. Oberoi worked in a public sector bank.

He earned his bachelor's degree in Commerce and a post graduate diploma in Mass Media from Delhi University. He then earned an MBA in International Business from Amity International Business School, Noida.

Work
Karan's first job was as a graphic designer for an advertising agency. He has also learnt acting  from Anupam Kher's Acting School, Actor Prepares.

As a fashion model Oberoi has walked for Fashion designers such as Rohit Bal, Shantanu & Nikhil, Rajesh Pratap Singh, Arjun Khanna and for brands like Aldo Group, Jack & Jones and Lamborghini. He is also seen walking for designers in fashion weeks  Lakme Fashion Week, Wills Fashion Week, Beach Resort Fashion Week, GQ Fashion Nights and India Couture Week.

He has been the poster boy of FBB brand for two consecutive years, and has  modelled for Royal Enfield motorcycles & Riding Apparels, Reebok India and Japanese Automobile brand Isuzu.
He has appeared on the cover for Health & Nutrition and Men's Health. He was the official brand ambassador for British Nutrition.

In September 2019, Karan was invited as a celebrity guest on Times Food's cooking show, Cooking with Celebs.

Awards and recognition
Oberoi was awarded as 'Top Fitness Model' by HT Brunch in early 2018. He won the title of 'Best Body' at Mr. India International. At the Global Leadership Awards held in April 2018, he won the 'Youth Icon Model of the Year'. He was labelled as "Hottie of the fortnight" by Filmfare magazine. In March 2018, he was featured in the list of 'India's top supermodels' by Hindustan Times. He was appointed as the 'World Peace Messenger' in June 2018 by the World Peace and Diplomacy Organization, a part of United Nations Global Compact in June 2018.

References

External links 
 

Indian male models
Delhi University alumni
Living people
1987 births